Radostny is a rural locality (a settlement) in Podborny Selsoviet, Krutikhinsky District, Altai Krai, Russia. The population was 223 as of 2013. There are 7 streets.

Geography 
Radostny is located 11 km west of Krutikha (the district's administrative centre) by road. Krutikha is the nearest rural locality.

References 

Rural localities in Krutikhinsky District